In the UFO TV series, the SHADO Interceptor, also known as "Moonbase Interceptor" is the primary defence spacecraft of the secret SHADO Moonbase.

Description
The Interceptors are red and white space fighters used over the Moon and in Earth's orbit, equipped only with a self-destroying frontal nuclear missile.

The Interceptors, usually, fly in groups of three during a period of red alert. These spacecraft always takeoff within three elevators hidden in as many lunar craters. During the flight, the three missiles are fired almost simultaneously.

These spacecraft cannot fly in Earth's atmosphere, for unknown reasons. Their UFO opponents cannot stay in Earth's atmosphere for prolonged periods, because they would probably explode. Commander Straker, Colonel Freeman and Colonel Foster say this in "Survival", "Conflict", "The Square Triangle", "Sub-Smash" and "The Cat With Ten Lives".

Legacy
The Interceptor is one of the symbols of the UFO series and the inspiration for the Space: 1999 Mark IX Hawk.

Dinky model 
The Dinky Interceptor was a toy model spacecraft made by Dinky Toys and based on the SHADO spacecraft.  It was manufactured and sold for six years and, during this time, changed appearance several times.

Earliest version
The earliest version was metallic green rather than white, with orange skis and orange stickers, and featuring gold details.  This had a clear canopy with a red seated figure with outreached arms.  This was the same figure as used in the Joe 90 car. Early versions can be easily detected, as they have a slight raised rim around the chrome gun panel in front of the canopy.  Later models did not have this.

1975 version
The year 1975 appears to signify the change where at this point the canopy was blue and the figure became Interceptor 351 specific, in that it was green and had lowered arms.  For a period both blue and clear canopies were used. Red-legged versions also appeared around this time and are now considered rare.

Later versions
As production continued it appears that cost constraints and issues regarding toxicity of paints led to the issue of the models with bright casting parts instead of gold painted as featured in the 1978 catalogue. In the 1978, catalogue the skis are turned up on the trailing edge. Final models appeared with no chrome plating, bright metal parts and a black nose.

See also
 Eagle Transporter
 Skydiver (submarine)

References

Interceptor
Fictional spacecraft
Fictional military vehicles